Phil Lehnhoff (born December 8, 1960) is an American former professional tennis player.

Born in Moraga, California, Lehnhoff competed on the professional tour in the early 1980s and played college tennis for the University of California, Berkeley.

Lehnhoff had a career high singles ranking of 182 in the world and featured in the qualifying draw for the 1983 Wimbledon Championships. He made the second round of two tour events, the 1982 Quito Open and the 1984 WCT Tournament of Champions in Forest Hills.

References

External links
 
 

1960 births
Living people
American male tennis players
California Golden Bears men's tennis players
People from Moraga, California
Tennis people from California